NEXXICE is the name for synchronized skating teams representing Burlington Skating Centre from Burlington, Ontario, Canada. Their senior team are twelve-time Canadian national champions (2007–15,2017,2023), the first North American team to win the World Championships (2009), and again in 2015. They are 2012–14 World silver medalists and 2007–08 & 2016-17 World bronze medalists.

The NEXXICE teams' coaching staff includes Shelley Barnett and Anne Schelter. For the 2006–07 season the club added a Junior competitive team and Adult competitive team to their club. Both are coached by Trish Mills. In the 2009–10 season the Adult team switched to the Open category. In the 2011–12 season the club announced that the Beginner, Juvenile, Novice and Intermediate teams from Burlington (formerly Ice Image) would now be under the name NEXXICE as well.

Competitive results

NEXXICE Senior (2000–2010)

NEXXICE Senior (2010–2020)

NEXXICE Junior

Other NEXXICE teams

Programs

NEXXICE Senior

NEXXICE Junior

References
 Skate Canada: Nexxice crowned Canadian Champions at national synchronized skating championships
 Slam!Sports: Nexxice soars to world bronze

External links
 NEXXICE
 Burlington Skating Centre

Senior synchronized skating teams
Figure skating in Canada
World Synchronized Skating Championships medalists